Tung Wah Group of Hospitals Chen Zao Men College (CZM, Traditional Chinese: 東華三院陳兆民中學) is a secondary school located at Kwai Chung, New Territories, Hong Kong. Initiated in 1969 by the Board of Directors of Tung Wah Group of Hospitals, Tung Wah Group of Hospitals Chen Zao Men College was named after Mr Chen Zao Men (陳兆民先生).

History
1969
The school was initiated by the Board of Directors of the Tung Wah Group of Hospitals as the fourth secondary school in the New Territories. 

20 September 1970
The school was named as TWGHs Chen Zao Men College after Mr. Chen Zao Men donated the construction fee for the schoolbuilding.

Students and staff

The school consists of 929 students from 24 classes and 68 staff at the year of 2007/2008 and is headed by her principal, Miss Au Yeung Suk Lan.

Principal, Mr. Choi Chi Chiu retired in 2016.

See also
 Education in Hong Kong
 List of schools in Hong Kong

External links
T.W.G.Hs Chen Zao Men College
T.W.G.Hs Chen Zao Men College Chen Wong Shou Jung Library
 T.W.G.Hs Chen Zao Men College Alumni Association
T.W.G.Hs Chen Zao Men College Parents-Teachers' Association

Secondary schools in Hong Kong
Chen Zao Men College
Chen Zao Men College
Kwai Shing
Kwai Chung